Oil reserves in Libya are the largest in Africa and among the ten largest globally with  as of 2010. Libya is considered a highly attractive oil area due to its low cost of oil production (as low as $1 per barrel at some fields in 2002), low sulfur content, being classified as "sweet crude" and in its proximity to European markets. Libya's challenge is maintaining production at mature fields, while finding and developing new oil fields. Most of Libya remains under-explored as a result of past sanctions and disagreements with foreign oil companies.

Cumulative production through 2009 was 27 Gbbl. Given the stated number, this would be 65% of reserves.

The drilling of oil wells in Libya was first authorised by the Petroleum Law of 1955. The National Oil Corporation is the largest oil company of Libya .

Oil reserves in Libya are the largest in Africa and the ninth largest in the world with 41.5 billion barrels (6.60 × 10 9  m 3 ) (or 3% of world oil reserves in 2007. The production of oil was 1.8 million barrels per day (290 × 10 3  m 3 /d ) in 2006, giving Libya 63 years of reserves at the current rate of production and in the absence of new discoveries.

Features 
Libya is considered a very attractive oil country due to its low oil production cost (around $1 per barrel for some wells), and its proximity to European markets. Libya wants to increase its production from 1.8 Mbbl/d (290 × 10 3  m 3 /d ) in 2006 to 3 Mbbl/d (480 × 10 3 m  3 / d) in 2010-13, but with current oil fields showing production declining by 7-8%, Libya's challenge is to maintain production from mature fields, while finding and developing new oil fields. Most of Libya's territory remains unexplored due to past sanctions and disagreements with foreign oil companies .

Prior to 2011, foreign companies exploiting Libyan oil were the National Oil Corporation (National Oil Company of Libya ), Italy's ENI , Total, ConocoPhillips , Repsol -YPF, CNPC , Neft and Tatneft 2 .

In 2017, the leading companies exploiting Libyan oil are: ENI, Total and Schlumberger and, since this year, the Russian oil company Rosneft . Indeed, the Libyan national oil company (NOC) has signed a cooperation agreement with the Russian company for investments in the hydrocarbons sector 3 .

InFebruary 2018, the French company Total announces the acquisition for an amount of 450 million dollars, of the Libyan company Marathon Oil Libya Limited. The latter holds a 16.33% stake in the Waha 4,5 concessions .

History 
The drilling of oil wells in Libya was authorized by the Petroleum Law of 1955 6 .

Cumulative production in 2009 was 27 Gbbl 7 . This would represent 65% of the reserves.

In 2010, 28% of Libyan oil was exported to Italy , 15% to France , 11% to China , 10% to Germany , 10% to Spain 2 . The gains made by Libya through the sale of crude oil are estimated at 50 billion dollars, the country then produced 1.6 million barrels per day.

The fall of Gaddafi in 2011 plunged the country into economic turmoil. It will be necessary to waitMay 2012for oil production to return to its pre-conflict level 2 . But between 2014 and 2016, production plunged to less than 500,000 barrels per day.

In 2017, the country announced record earnings figures since 2011. Indeed, the president of the NOC, Moustafa Sanalla, announced for the 2017 financial year, revenues of 14 billion dollars. (three times more than in 2016) 8 with a production of 1.25 million barrels per day 9 .

Notes and references 
"  Libya - Oil  "  [ archive ] , Country Analysis Briefs , US Energy Information Administration, 2007 (consulted theJanuary 20, 2008) .
Laurent Ribadeau Dumas , "  Oil, Libya's main resource  "  [ archive ] , on France TV Info ,June 25, 2012.
"  UPDATE 1-Russia's Rosneft, Libya's NOC sign oil offtake deal  ", Reuters , ‎ Tue Feb 21 10:23:27 utc 2017 ( read online  [ archive ] , accessedMarch 5, 2018).
Jean-Guy Debord , "  Total acquires a 16.33% stake in the Waha concessions in Libya  "  [ archive ] , at www.euro-petrole.com (consulted onMarch 4, 2018) .
Frédéric Dubessy , "  Total buys Marathon Oil Libya and wins 50,000 barrels of oil  ", Econostrum | All the economic news in the Mediterranean ,March 2, 2018 ( read online  [ archive ] , accessedMarch 5, 2018).
Frank C. Waddams , "The Libyan Petroleum Law of 1955" , in The Libyan oil industry , Taylor & Francis,1980 ( ISBN  9780709903529 , online presentation  [ archive ] ).
"  Daily and Cumulative Crude Oil Production in OPEC Members  " , OPEC Annual Statistical Bulletin , OPEC, 2009 ( read online  [ archive ] ).
"  Libya - Oil: record increase in revenue in 2017  ", Le Point Afrique ,January 6, 2018 ( read online  [ archive ] , accessedMarch 5, 2018).
"  Libya: oil production returns to an unprecedented level since 2014 - RFI  ", RFI Afrique ,May 2, 2017 ( read online  [ archive ] , accessedMarch 5, 2018).

See also 

 Energy in Libya
 Libyan oil industry
 Mining industry of Libya
 National Oil Corporation

References

Petroleum in Libya
Libya
Geology of Libya